Alejandro Arana Schlettwein (born 5 August 1997) is a Mexican professional footballer who plays as a goalkeeper for Liga MX club Querétaro.

References

Living people
1997 births
Association football goalkeepers
Coras de Nayarit F.C. footballers
Irapuato F.C. footballers
Club Atlético Zacatepec players
Ascenso MX players
Liga Premier de México players
Tercera División de México players
Footballers from Mexico City
Atlético Morelia players
CD Tudelano footballers
Mexican expatriate sportspeople in Spain
Expatriate footballers in Spain
Mexican footballers